Admiral George Anson Byron, 7th Baron Byron (8 March 1789 – 1 March 1868) was a British nobleman, naval officer, peer, politician, and the seventh Baron Byron, in 1824 succeeding his cousin the poet George Gordon Byron, 6th Baron Byron in that peerage. As a career naval officer, he was notable for being his predecessor's opposite in temperament and lifestyle.

Parentage and ménage
He was the only son of Honorable George Anson Byron and Charlotte Henrietta Dallas, and grandson of the admiral and explorer The Hon. John Byron, who circumnavigated the world with George Anson in 1740–44.

He married Elizabeth Mary Chandos Pole on 18 March 1816. She was the daughter of Sacheverell Pole Esq., of Radbourne Hall, b. 16 June 1769. During this man's lifetime, he became of representative of Sir John Chandos, K.G., and by sign manual, or deed poll assumed the additional surname of Chandos. Elizabeth was descended from a well-documented long line of the Pole family, including Cardinal Pole, who at the time of Henry VIII, was the last Catholic Archbishop of Canterbury and the son of the last Yorkist heiress, Margaret, countess of Salisbury. Elizabeth's mother, Mary, was the daughter of the Rev. Henry Ware, D.D., Rector of Balrothey. The couple had seven children:
 The Hon. Mary Anne Byron (c.1817–1885)
 Captain George Anson Byron, 8th Baron Byron (1818–1870)
 The Hon. Francis Xavier Byron (1820–??)
 The Hon. Frederick Byron (1822–1861)
 The Hon. Georgiana Byron (1824–1893)
 The Rev. Hon. Augustus Byron (1828–1907)
 The Rev. Hon. William Byron (1831–1907)

Naval career
Byron joined the Royal Navy as a volunteer in December 1800, serving in the Napoleonic Wars, and attaining the rank of captain in 1814. In 1824 Byron was chosen to accompany homewards the bodies of Hawaiian monarchs Liholiho (known as King Kamehameha II) and Queen Kamāmalu, who had died of measles during a state visit to England. He toured the islands and recorded his observations. With the consent of Christian missionaries to the islands, he also removed wooden carvings and other artefacts of the chiefs of ancient Hawaii from the temple ruins of Puuhonua O Hōnaunau. On his return journey in 1825, Lord Byron discovered and charted Malden Island, which he named after his surveying officer; also the island of Mauke which he named "Parry Island" in honour of Sir William Edward Parry, and Starbuck Island. Starbuck was named in honour of Capt. Valentine Starbuck, an American whaler who had sighted the island while carrying the Hawaiian royal couple to England in 1823–1824, but had probably been previously sighted by his cousin and fellow-whaler Capt. Obed Starbuck in 1823. Malden may have been the island sighted by another whaling captain William Clark in 1823, aboard the Winslow. Byron became a rear-admiral in 1849 and a vice-admiral in 1857. Byron retired as admiral in 1862.

Arms

See also
 European and American voyages of scientific exploration

Notes

References
 Dunmore, John (1992); Who's Who in Pacific Navigation, Australia:Melbourne University Press, 
 Quanchi, Max & Robson, John, (2005); Historical Dictionary of the Discovery and Exploration of the Pacific Islands, USA: Scarecrow Press, 
 Bloxam, Andrew (1925), Diary of Andrew Bloxam: naturalist of the "Blonde" on her trip from England to the Hawaiian islands, 1824-25 Volume 10 of Bernice P. Bishop Museum special publication
George Byron, 7th Baron Byron, at thepeerage.com (accessed 26 November 2009)

1789 births
1868 deaths
18th-century Royal Navy personnel
19th-century Royal Navy personnel
19th-century explorers
Permanent Lords-in-Waiting
British explorers of the Pacific
Royal Navy admirals
Hawaiian Kingdom
George
Royal Navy personnel of the Napoleonic Wars
Barons Byron